Yerizak is an abandoned village in the Amasia Municipality of the Shirak Province of Armenia. The village was populated by Azerbaijanis before the exodus of Azerbaijanis from Armenia after the outbreak of the Nagorno-Karabakh conflict.

Demographics

References 

Former populated places in Shirak Province